In neutral or absolute geometry, and in hyperbolic geometry, there may be many lines parallel to a given line  through a point  not on line ; however, in the plane, two parallels may be closer to  than all others (one in each direction of ).

Thus it is useful to make a new definition concerning parallels in neutral geometry. If there are closest parallels to a given line they are known as the limiting parallel, asymptotic parallel or horoparallel (horo from  — border).

For rays, the relation of limiting parallel is an equivalence relation, which includes the equivalence relation of being coterminal.

If, in a hyperbolic triangle, the pairs of sides are limiting parallel, then the triangle is an ideal triangle.

Definition

A ray  is a limiting parallel to a ray  if they are coterminal or if they lie on distinct lines not equal to the line , they do not meet, and every ray in the interior of the angle  meets the ray .

Properties
Distinct lines carrying limiting parallel rays do not meet.

Proof
Suppose that the lines carrying distinct parallel rays met. Thus . Contradiction.

See also
 horocycle, In Hyperbolic geometry a curve whose normals are limiting parallels
 angle of parallelism

References

Non-Euclidean geometry
Hyperbolic geometry